Fu Bo is a 2003 Hong Kong film directed by Wong Ching Po.

Cast
 Eric Tsang
 Anthony Wong Chau Sang
 Liu Kai-Chi
 Johnson Lee
 Pauline Suen

Crew
 Wong Ching Po - director
 Yip Wai-Shan - producer
 Sandy Yip - producer
 Lee Kung Lok, Wong Ching Po - editor
 Wong Ping-Hung - cinematographer

Tagline
 "Don't ask questions, just breathe."

External links 

Films directed by Wong Ching-po
2003 films
2003 thriller films
2000s Cantonese-language films
Hong Kong thriller films
2000s Hong Kong films